Mechkovitsa is a village in Gabrovo Municipality, in Gabrovo Province, in northern central Bulgaria. The population in 2008 was 30 persons.

References

Villages in Gabrovo Province